Qeshlaq-e Yusef Reza (also Romanized as Qeshlāq-e Yūsef Reẕā and Qeshlāq-e Yūsof Reẕā; also known as Yūsef Reẕā) is a village in Asgariyeh Rural District, in the Central District of Pishva County, Tehran Province, Iran. At the 2006 census, its population was 1,289, in 285 families.

References 

Populated places in Pishva County